Lotus Glen Correctional Centre is an Australian prison facility located 14 km south of Mareeba and 20 km north of Atherton in the locality of Arriga in Far North Queensland. Lotus Glen provides a correctional service for high, medium, low and open classification inmates, including a Prison Farm with a capacity for 115 "open security" inmates.

Population 

Lotus Glen's "catchment area" for its inmate population includes Cairns, The Cape York Region, The Torres Strait Islands and other isolated communities. 
The centre has a total capacity of 498 (398 within the secure unit and 100 at the centre's farm).
Generally, 60% - 70% of the population of the centre are Aboriginal and Torres Strait Islander persons.

Facilities 
The centre is used as a remand and reception facility and provides the programs necessary to induct both first time inmates and repeat offenders into the correctional environment. The facility runs work programs in the fields of both farming and industry, providing useful skills to the inmates in preparation for their release.

Facilities are being expanded to house 300 secure cells and 24 low-security farm beds at a cost of A$445 million. The new buildings have been built outside the existing secure area and are expected to be completed by December 2011.

Programs 
Cultural programs are conducted at Lotus Glen in response to the centre's high Indigenous population. Specialist Aboriginal and Torres Strait Islander staff including correctional officers are employed to meet the needs of the Aboriginal and Torres Strait Islander prisoners. These needs are met through cultural programs, Elder visits, regular community visits, and ensuring that family ties are maintained.

The facility also runs a prison farm for low and open security inmates. Although not necessarily put to "hard labour" the inmates are expected to work the farms, allowing them time to develop skills and escape the daily routine of the prison.

In 2017, due to a new program of medication, Lotus Glen became Australia's first Hepatitis C-free prison.

See also

 List of Australian prisons

References

1989 establishments in Australia
Buildings and structures in Far North Queensland
Prisons in Queensland
Maximum security prisons in Australia